Kamarusak-e Pain (also Romanized as Kam‘arūsak-e Pā’īn; also known as Kam ‘Arūsak-e Soflá) is a village in Madvarat Rural District, in the Central District of Shahr-e Babak County, Kerman Province, Iran. At the 2006 census, its population was 41, in 11 families.

References 

Populated places in Shahr-e Babak County